The 2020–21 Cupa României was the 18th season of the annual Romanian primary football knockout tournament.

Participating clubs
The following 38 teams qualified for the competition:

Round dates

Source:

Preliminary round
2 Liga III teams entered the competition for the preliminary round. The match was scheduled for Wednesday, 3 March, but did not take place, Academia de Fotbal şi Tenis Măgura progressing to the next round.

First round
The team that advanced from the preliminary round will be joined by the remaining 9 Liga III teams, for a total of 10 teams. The majority of the matches in this round are scheduled for Sunday, 7 March.

Second Round/ Round of 32
The 5 teams that advanced from the first round will be joined by the remaining teams: 15 Liga II teams and 12 Liga I teams, for a total of 32 teams playing 16 matches. 14 matches were played on 24 March, one of which was subsequently awarded, while two were not played.

Second Round/ Round of 16
The 16 qualified teams played the 8 matches on April 28.

Quarterfinals
The 8 qualified teams played the 4 matches on May 12.

Semifinals
The 4 qualified teams played the two matches on June 2.

Final

References

Romania
2020–21